Phillips Township is located in White County, Illinois. As of the 2010 census, its population was 1,258 and it contained 610 housing units.

History
Phillips Township was likely named for Major Alexander Phillips, who made a land entry in 1817 for a quarter section of land abutting to the west of where Phillipstown, Illinois would be platted two decades later.

Geography

Demographics

References

External links
City-data.com
Illinois State Archives

Townships in White County, Illinois
Townships in Illinois
1871 establishments in Illinois